Al-Jawhara Sport Club, is an Iraqi football team based in Babil, that plays in the Iraq Division Three.

History
In the first year of its foundation, Al-Jawhara team played in the 2021–22 Iraq Division Three, and in the same season, they topped their group, and they were able to promote to the Iraq Division Two without scoring a goal against them.

In the second season, the team played in 2022–23 Iraq Division Two, and was able to top its group in the first stage of the tournament, and move to the second stage as a representative of Babil.

Managerial history
 Qahtan Dakhel

See also
 2021–22 Iraq Division Three

References

External links
 Iraq Clubs- Foundation Dates

Association football clubs established in 2021
Football clubs in Babil